Chris Snitko (born January 24, 1973), is a retired U.S. soccer goalkeeper who was the 1995 ISAA Goalkeeper of the Year.  He then spent six seasons in Major League Soccer and earned five caps with the United States U-23 men's national soccer team.

Youth
Snitko, though born in Hackensack, New Jersey, grew up in Anaheim, California.  He attended Canyon High School where he played on both the soccer and baseball teams.  While in high school, Snitko also trained with the UCLA men's soccer team during his spare time. He also spent two years with the local youth club, North Huntington Beach Futbol Club where his team, the Untouchables took the 1990 state title.  After graduating from high school, Snitko attended UCLA where he played on the men's soccer team.  In 1992, he sat as Brad Friedel manned the Bruins' nets.  However, in 1993, Snitko became the starting goalkeeper for UCLA, a position he held for the next three seasons.  He gained his greatest success as a senior when he was selected as a first team All American and the ISAA Goalkeeper of the Year.  His 31 career shutouts and 47 career victories are both second on the team's respective lists.

National team
In 1996, the Kansas City Wizards of Major League Soccer (MLS) selected Snitko in the first round (fifth overall) of the 1996 MLS College Draft.  That year he did not play with the Wizards as the team allowed Snitko to train and play full-time with the U.S. U-23 team as it prepared for the 1996 Summer Olympics in Atlanta, Georgia.  While Snitko made the U.S. Olympic team, he did not start in the tournament because the team also boasted Kasey Keller as it starting goalkeeper.  However, Snitko did earn 5 junior national team caps with the U-23 team.

Professional
In 1997, Snitko rejoined the Wizards full-time.  Once again, he found himself behind a great keeper, this time Mike Ammann.  That season Amman set a league record for 21 wins.  Snitko saw time in only five games that year.  When the Wizards traded Amman in 1999, it did Snitko no favors as the team picked up Tony Meola.  After only a few games of the 2000 season, the Wizards traded Snitko to the Chicago Fire for two draft picks.  Snitko promptly started for the Fire, earning a shutout in his first game with his new team.  However, he ended the season up with only five appearances with the Fire and was traded to the Dallas Burn on March 21, 2001 for a third round draft pick in the 2003 College Draft.  On June 27, 2001, an error on Snitko's part resulted in a goal for the Seattle Sounders in the second round of the 2001 Open Cup.  Soon after he suffered an injury to his ankle and he only played in one game that season.  He retired from playing professionally at the end of the 2001 season.

In 2003, the Chicago Fire hired Snitko as a goalkeeper coach for their farm system.

He is currently an architectural photographer in Orange County, California.

References

External links
 
 UCLA player data

1973 births
Living people
American soccer players
Chicago Fire FC players
FC Dallas players
Footballers at the 1996 Summer Olympics
Association football goalkeepers
Sporting Kansas City players
Olympic soccer players of the United States
University of California, Los Angeles alumni
UCLA Bruins men's soccer players
Sportspeople from Hackensack, New Jersey
Soccer players from New Jersey
Major League Soccer players
United States men's under-23 international soccer players
Sporting Kansas City draft picks
All-American men's college soccer players